Alexander Szymanowski (born 13 October 1988), is an Argentine professional footballer who plays as a left winger for Italian  club Vibonese.

Raised in Spain, he spent most of his career there, totalling 42 games and 10 goals for Leganés in La Liga, and 82 appearances and 22 goals in Segunda División for that club and Recreativo. He also had a spell in Denmark with Brøndby, and suffered two-and-a-half seasons of injuries later in his career.

Club career

Early career
Born in Buenos Aires, Alexander moved to Guadarrama, Madrid in November 2000, at the age of 12. After four months on trial at Real Madrid, he subsequently represented Atlético Madrid, AD Unión Adarve, CF Rayo Majadahonda, CA Leones de Castilla and Alcobendas CF as a youth.

Alexander made his senior debuts with UD San Sebastián de los Reyes in the 2007–08 campaign, suffering relegation from Segunda División B. In the 2009 summer he moved to Tercera División side Antequera CF, appearing regularly and subsequently returning to his previous club in the following year.

In July 2011 Alexander moved to RSD Alcalá in the third tier. He finished the season with 38 appearances and 11 goals, being the club's top goalscorer.

Recreativo
On 11 July 2012, Alexander signed a three-year contract with Recreativo de Huelva in Segunda División. After being nearly left out of the squad due to not having an EU passport, he played his first match as a professional on 25 August, starting in a 1–0 home win against CD Mirandés.

On 14 October Alexander scored his first professional goal, netting the last in a 2–5 away loss against Girona FC. On 26 May 2013, he scored a brace in a 2–1 home win against Córdoba CF, and contributed with 38 appearances and 10 goals during his first campaign, with his side narrowly avoiding relegation.

Brøndby
On 29 August 2013, Alexander signed a one-year loan contract with Danish Superliga club Brøndby IF with a €2 million buyout clause. On 15 September he made his debut, in a 2–1 home win over Odense Boldklub. Late in the month, Alexander scored his first two goals abroad, in a 3–2 win over FC Copenhagen, being also named man of the match.

On 10 January 2014, Brøndby activated the buyout clause in Alexander's contract, who signed a two-and-half year contract with the Danish side. On 27 July of the following year he was released.

Leganés
In July 2015, Alexander signed a two-year deal with CD Leganés in the second tier. He was an undisputed starter for the Madrid side during the season, scoring a career-best 12 goals to help his side promote to La Liga for the first time ever.

Alexander made his debut in the main category of Spanish football on 27 August 2016, starting in a 0–0 home draw against Atlético Madrid. He scored his first goal in the division on 25 September, but in a 1–2 home loss against Valencia CF.

On 20 July 2020, Alexander left Leganés after struggling severely with injuries during his last two seasons at the club.

Later career
On 5 October 2020, transfer deadline day, Alexander returned to Recreativo, now in the third tier. He was one of two players sent off in a 3–1 loss at Algeciras CF the following 24 January, and the season ended with an unprecedented double relegation to the fifth tier following a restructuring of the Spanish football league system.

Alexander joined Gimnástica Segoviana CF of the new Segunda División RFEF on 6 August 2021.

Personal life
Alexander's paternal grandfather was born in 1923 in what was then Poland, but has since been transferred to Ukraine. He moved at the age of five to Argentina and married a Russian woman. 

Alexander's sister, Marianela, is also a footballer who has played in the Primera División and for Argentina's women's team. After he scored his first double in Primera in an important 4–0 win over Betis in May 2017, they embraced each other in Butarque's stands.

Career statistics

Club

References

External links
 
 
 

1988 births
Living people
Footballers from Buenos Aires
Argentine people of Polish descent
Argentine people of Russian descent
Argentine footballers
Association football wingers
La Liga players
Segunda División players
Segunda División B players
Tercera División players
UD San Sebastián de los Reyes players
Antequera CF footballers
RSD Alcalá players
Recreativo de Huelva players
CD Leganés players
Gimnástica Segoviana CF footballers
Danish Superliga players
Brøndby IF players
U.S. Vibonese Calcio players
Argentine expatriate footballers
Argentine expatriate sportspeople in Spain
Argentine expatriate sportspeople in Denmark
Argentine expatriate sportspeople in Italy
Expatriate footballers in Spain
Expatriate men's footballers in Denmark
Expatriate footballers in Italy